Entertainment City, also known as E-City (formerly PAGCOR City and Manila Bay Tourism City), is a gaming and entertainment complex under development by PAGCOR spanning an area of  in Bay City, Metro Manila, Philippines. It was first envisioned by PAGCOR in 2002. Alongside the Aseana City business development, it lies at the western side of Roxas Boulevard and south of SM Central Business Park (SM Mall of Asia), part of Parañaque.

The project is officially named as the Bagong Nayong Pilipino-Entertainment City through an executive order by President Gloria Macapagal Arroyo and has been called several other names by the press. The most common name being referenced is "Entertainment City". The site has been declared a PEZA-approved economic zone and in 2017, President Rodrigo Duterte named Entertainment City as Expo Pilipino Entertainment City will be named after the exposition for the centennial of the independence of the Philippines in 1998 called Expo Pilipino.

Hotels and Casinos
Five Integrated Resort projects have been qualified to date in accordance with the Terms of Reference and are under construction by phases.

 Solaire Resort & Casino - is the first integrated resort casino complex to open in the Entertainment City with a lavish grand launch at a cost of $1 million on March 16, 2013. Built at a cost of $1.2 billion, the resort casino sits on 8.3- hectare land. It is owned by Bloomberry Resorts Corporation of port magnate Enrique Razon.
 City of Dreams Manila - is the second resort casino complex to open at the Entertainment City. It is owned by Melco Resorts and Entertainment (Philippines) Corporation, a joint venture between Melco-Crown and its local partner Belle Corporation of mall magnate Henry Sy of SM Investments Corporation. It was soft-launched on December 14, 2014, with grand opening on February 2, 2015. Built at a cost of $1.3 billion, the resort casino sits on a 6.2-hectare property at the Entertainment City gaming complex featuring three luxurious hotel brands - Nobu, Nüwa, and Hyatt Regency with an aggregate of 950 rooms. The Fortune Egg structure is its most prominent featured design.
 Okada Manila - (formerly Manila Bay Resorts) is the third resort casino complex to open at the Entertainment City. It is owned by Tiger Resorts Leisure and Entertainment, Inc., the Philippine subsidiary of Universal Entertainment Corporation. It features a large fountain and an indoor beach club. The resort casino opened on December 30, 2016.
 Westside City Resorts World - (formerly Resorts World Bayshore) is the upcoming integrated resort casino complex within the Entertainment City casino and entertainment complex. The gaming resort owing to its location on the west side of the Entertainment City complex was renamed as such in 2014. When completed, it will include Hotel Okura Manila, Westin Hotel, Kingsford Hotel, Genting Grand and Crockfords Tower offering some 1,500 guest rooms. It is expected to start initial operations in 2021. The resort casino is owned by Travellers International Hotels Group and its partner the Genting group which owns the Resorts World Brand and the real estate developer, Megaworld Corporation of Andrew Tan.
 NayonLanding - to be built by Landing Resorts Philippines Development Corp., is the upcoming integrated resort casino complex to operate an integrated resort casino in the complex which will include the new Nayong Filipino cultural theme park as part of its features.  The new operator is expected to groundbreak on August 9, 2018. The project is currently stalled due to the five-year moratorium on new casinos in Entertainment City.

See also
 Gambling in Metro Manila
 PAGCOR Tower

References
Map of the Philippine Entertainment City in Paranaque

External links
 
 Pagcor All About Entertainment and Tourism
 Height limit a problem for proposed structures at Pagcor City

Land reclamation in the Philippines
Buildings and structures under construction in Metro Manila
Mixed-use developments in Metro Manila
Entertainment districts in the Philippines
Planned communities in the Philippines
Redeveloped ports and waterfronts in the Philippines
Manila Bay
Parañaque